Jean Perdrix was a French film director who was a member of the committee for short films at the Festival de Cannes in 1955 and 1956.

Filmography 
Director
 1951 :  (short film)
 1952 : Mort en sursis (short film)
 1949 : L'Enfer des fards
 1948 : Au pays des grands pâturages

Unit production manager
 1955 : 
 1953 :

External links 

French film directors
French film producers